Tatyana Rastopshyna-Shelekhova (born 4 April 1946). She won a silver allround medal at the world championships in 1973 and a bronze allround medal at the European championships in 1974. She competed in 1000 m and 3000 m at the 1976 Winter Olympics and finished in 15th and 14th place, respectively.

She won two national titles in 1973, in 1000 m and 1500 m. Allround she finished second in 1972 and 1974 and third in 1973.

Personal bests: 
500 m – 43.50 (1974)
1000 m – 1:26.8 (1973)
1500 m – 2:14.3 (1973)
 3000 m – 4:47.0 (1973)
 5000 m – 8:48.3 (1976)

References

External links
 

1946 births
Living people
Sportspeople from Kyiv
Soviet female speed skaters
Ukrainian female speed skaters
Olympic speed skaters of the Soviet Union
Speed skaters at the 1976 Winter Olympics
World Allround Speed Skating Championships medalists